Madam Butterfly is the seventh album by the American soul/R&B group Tavares, released in 1979 on Capitol Records.

Commercial performance
By this stage in the group's career, they had become known as a disco act due to successful singles such as "Heaven Must Be Missing an Angel", "Whodunit" and "More Than a Woman." However, Madam Butterfly is noted for its lack of anything approaching disco material, and, as such, is considered to be more akin in style to the group's 1973-'75 albums than to their '76-'78 Freddie Perren-produced output.

"Never Had a Love Like This Before", one of several slow jams on the album, became a top 5 R&B hit and has subsequently become a quiet storm radio classic, while tracks such as "I'm Back for More" are more funk-based than listeners had come to expect from Tavares. The title track Madam Butterfly received considerable airplay on R&B radio stations, and became a hit, but was not released as a single by Capitol. The album performed respectably on the R&B chart, peaking at #13, but failed to achieve substantial sales in the crossover market.  Its reputation has grown over the years and it is now considered among the group's best.

Track listing 
 "Straight From Your Heart" (Len Ron Hanks, Zane Grey) - 4:23
 "Games, Games" (Sam Dees) - 4:30
 "Madam Butterfly" (Johnny Simon, Kenny Stover) - 4:29
 "Let Me Heal the Bruises" (Sam Dees) - 4:24
 "Never Had a Love Like This Before" (Len Ron Hanks, Zane Grey) - 4:32
 "One Telephone Call Away" (Benorce Blackmon) - 4:22
 "My Love Calls" (Sam Dees) - 5:05
 "Positive Forces" (Joe Reaves, Lonnie Reaves) - 2:56
 "I'm Back for More" (Kenny Stover) - 2:58

Singles 
 "Never Had a Love Like This Before" (US R&B #5)
 "Straight From Your Heart" (US R&B #77)

Personnel
Tavares

with:
Benorce Blackmon, Steve Erquiaga - guitar
David Shields - bass
Ron "Have Mercy" Kersey - keyboards
Len Ron Hanks - keyboards on "Straight From Your Heart" and "Never Had a Love Like This Before"
Gaylord Birch - drums
Melvin Webb - percussion
Don Moors - vibraphone
John Roberts, Oscar Brashear - trumpet, flugelhorn
Grover Mitchell, Linda Small, Maurice Spears, Tom McIntosh - trombone
Bobby Martin, Len Ron Hanks, Ron "Have Mercy" Kersey - arrangements
Paul Shure - concertmaster

References

External links

1979 albums
Tavares (group) albums
Albums produced by Bobby Martin
Albums arranged by Bobby Martin
Capitol Records albums